Thode may refer to:

People
Amerigo Thodé (born 1950), Curaçaoan politician
Connell Thode (1911–2014), New Zealand naval officer and yachtsman
Harry Thode (1910–1997), Canadian geochemist, nuclear chemist, and academic administrator
Henry Thode (1857–1920), German art historian

Places
Thode, Saskatchewan, village in Saskatchewan, Canada
Thode Island, Antarctic island

Other uses
Thoda Hai Thode Ki Zaroorat Hai, Indian soap opera aired in 1997
Thodi Khushi Thode Gham, Indian soap opera on Sony Entertainment Television India